Elections were held in the Australian state of Queensland on 7 December 1974 to elect the 82 members of the Legislative Assembly of Queensland.

The National-Liberal Coalition won a third consecutive victory under Joh Bjelke-Petersen, and the seventh consecutive victory for the National Party in Queensland, which had renamed itself from the Country Party since the previous election. The Labor Party lost two-thirds of its seats, including that of leader Perc Tucker—its worst showing in an election until 2012.

Labor was reduced to only 11 seats, leading observers to call Labor's caucus a "cricket team." William Bowe of Crikey wrote that for years, the election stood as "the gold standard for Australian election massacres".

Key dates

Results

|}

Seats changing hands

 Members listed in italics did not recontest their seats.

Post-election pendulum

See also
 Members of the Queensland Legislative Assembly, 1972–1974
 Members of the Queensland Legislative Assembly, 1974–1977
 Candidates of the Queensland state election, 1974
 Bjelke-Petersen Ministry

References

Elections in Queensland
1974 elections in Australia
1970s in Queensland
December 1974 events in Australia